David Francis Graf (born August 5, 1953) is a former American football linebacker in the National Football League for the Cleveland Browns and the Washington Redskins.  He played college football at Penn State University and was drafted in the seventeenth round of the 1975 NFL Draft with the 421st overall pick.

1953 births
Living people
American football linebackers
Cleveland Browns players
Washington Redskins players
Penn State Nittany Lions football players
People from Dunkirk, New York